Floss may refer to:

Places
 Floß, in English spelling: Floss, a municipality in Bavaria, Germany
 Floß (river), in English spelling: Floss, a river of Bavaria, Germany
 Floss, Arkansas, an unincorporated community, United States

Art, entertainment, and media
 Floss (dance), a popular dance move
 Floss (mixtape), by Injury Reserve
 "Floss" (song), by AJ Tracey
 Floss McPhee, a character in the soap opera Home and Away
 Silken Floss, a character in the comic and film The Spirit

Computing
 FLOSS Weekly, a podcast of the twit.tv Network
 Free/libre and open-source software

Other uses
 Candy floss, or fairy floss (cotton candy)
 Common floss, another name for the shrub Chromolaena odorata
 Dental floss
 Embroidery floss
 Floss flower, another name for Ageratum houstonianum
 Meat floss

People with the given name
 Floss Casasola (1903–1991), a British Honduran teacher involved in the Belizean Independence Movement

People with the surname
 Heinrich Joseph Floss (1819–1881), a church historian and theologian
 Herbert Floss (1912–1943), an SS functionary of Nazi Germany
 Walter J. Floss Jr. (1923–2018), American politician

See also
 Al Flosso (1895–1976), American magician 
 Gaston Flosse (born 1931), French politician